Neamia is a genus of cardinalfishes native to the Indian Ocean and the western Pacific Ocean.

Species
The recognized species in this genus are:
 Neamia articycla T. H. Fraser & G. R. Allen, 2006 (circular cardinalfish)
 Neamia notula T. H. Fraser & G. R. Allen, 2001 (gillspot cardinalfish)
 Neamia octospina H. M. Smith & Radcliffe, 1912 (eight-spine cardinalfish)
 Neamia xenica T. H. Fraser, 2010

References

Apogoninae
Fish described in 1912
Taxa named by Hugh McCormick Smith
Taxa named by Lewis Radcliffe